Mikalay Ramanyuk (born 2 June 1984) is a Belarusian former professional footballer.

Honours
Naftan Novopolotsk
Belarusian Cup winner: 2008–09, 2011–12

External links

1984 births
Living people
People from Rechytsa
Sportspeople from Gomel Region
Belarusian footballers
Association football goalkeepers
FC Naftan Novopolotsk players
FC Slavia Mozyr players
FC Gomel players
FC Rechitsa-2014 players
FC Gorodeya players